The Omar Mosque and Islamic Center of Costa Rica is a mosque in San José, Costa Rica.

History
The construction of the mosque originated from a Palestinian migrant to the country. In early 1990s, he and other 14 people gathered at his house where they decided to build a mosque. They also traveled to Panama to ask to the local community there for financial support. The mosque was finally built and completed in 2002.

Activities
The mosque houses a library which features a collection of Islamic texts in Arabic and Spanish. It also holds classes on Islamic education to the local community.

See also
 Islam in Costa Rica

References

External links

 

2002 establishments in Costa Rica
Islam in Costa Rica
Mosques completed in 2002
Mosques in Central America
Religious buildings and structures in Costa Rica